SC Kriens is a football club based in Kriens, Switzerland, who currently play in the Swiss Challenge League. They currently play at the Stadion Kleinfeld and form a local rivalry with FC Lucerne.

SC Kriens women's team plays in the Nationalliga A since 2008.

History

The first club to be formed in Kriens was created in 1920 as Fussball Club Kriens, albeit folding in 1926, and succeeded by Rasensportclub Kriens between 1931 and 1939. The team as it exists today was founded on 14 June 1944. They initially played in Lucerne, before being granted a meadow at a site now named Kleinfeld in 1949, where they have played since.

Their first years were unremarkable, but support from the local municipality, a new stadium, and the introduction of several junior teams helped them to promotion to the 2. Liga in 1958. By 1975 the team challenged for promotion to the Nationalliga B under Paul Wolfisberg , who later managed FC Lucerne and the Swiss national team, before succeeding a year later in the 1975–76 season. As Wolfisberg left the team in 1978 and the core of homegrown players began to age, they fought against relegation, which became reality in 1981. They spent another single season in the second division in 1986–87, before achieving a more successful stint in 1990 that eventually led to two spells in the Nationalliga A in the 1993–94 and 1997–98 seasons. The team nearly achieved promotion on multiple occasions, albeit without success, under the leadership of managers such as Kudi Müller and Jürgen Seeberger. However, they failed to make the cut after the second division was restructured from 16 to 10 teams in 2012 and spent several years in lower divisions until 2018.

Stadium 
SC Kriens play at the Stadion Kleinfeld, which hosts a capacity of 5,370. It was originally known as the Waisenhausmatte, which was first opened on 7 August 1949. It received its first floodlights in 1950, and by 1958, the stadium reopened under its current name with an expanded seating of 700. In 1969, two further pitches and the current main stand were added.

Current squad

Out on loan

Famous players

References

External links
 Official website 

 
Kriens
Association football clubs established in 1944
1944 establishments in Switzerland
Kleinfeld
Buildings and structures in the canton of Lucerne